Juninho Bacuna (born 7 August 1997) is a professional footballer who plays as a central midfielder for  club Birmingham City. He began his career in his native Netherlands with Groningen before moving to English football with Huddersfield Town. After one season in the Premier League and two in the second-tier Championship, he spent six months with Scottish Premiership club Rangers and then joined Birmingham City in 2022. In international football, he played for the Netherlands up to under-21 level before switching in 2019 to represent Curaçao, for which he qualified by descent.

Club career

Groningen
Bacuna is a Groningen youth exponent. He made his Eredivisie debut on 5 February 2015 against Heracles Almelo replacing Yoell van Nieff after 79 minutes in a 2–2 away draw. He came off the bench to help the Green-White Army win the KNVB Cup in the 2014–15 season against defending champions PEC Zwolle. It was their first major trophy and they qualified for the UEFA Europa League.

Huddersfield Town
Bacuna signed for Premier League team Huddersfield Town on 20 June 2018, for an undisclosed fee for three years, with the club having the option for a further season.

On 27 October 2018, Bacuna made his debut in the Premier League in a 3-0 away defeat to Watford, coming on as a 78th minute substitute. On 16 March 2019, he scored his first goal for Huddersfield in a 4-3 defeat at West Ham.

After relegation from the Premier League, Huddersfield started the 2019-20 season in the EFL Championship badly, only amassing two points from their first nine games. Bacuna scored the only goal in the game in Huddersfield's first win of the season over Stoke City on 1 October 2019.

On 11 May 2021, Huddersfield exercised the option to extend Bacuna's contract until the end of the 2021–22 season.

Rangers 
On 19 August 2021, Bacuna signed for Scottish Premiership team Rangers. The player was paraded to the club's supporters during the half-time interval of Rangers' Europa League play-off game against Alashkert.

Birmingham City
On 27 January 2022, Bacuna returned to England when he joined Championship club Birmingham City on a three-and-a-half-year deal for an undisclosed fee. He scored his first Birmingham goal in a 3–0 win at home to Luton Town on 12 February.

International career
Bacuna represented his native Netherlands at under-18, under-20 and under-21 levels. He played eleven matches for the under-20s, and three for the under-21s, and scored twice in a 4–1 win against Bolivia.

He switched to represent Curaçao, for which he qualified by descent, in 2019. He played four matches in that year's CONCACAF Nations League A group stage, and once international football resumed after the COVID-19 pandemic, continued as a regular in the team.

In September 2022, Bacuna played two friendly matches for Curaçao against the Indonesia national team in Indonesia. In the first, he scored in a 3–2 defeat. In the second, he was sent off after receiving a second yellow card for a bad tackle on Marselino Ferdinan. He reacted to the dismissal by kicking the ball towards spectators, who retaliated by throwing water bottles onto the pitch. After the match, Bacuna was targeted on social media with abusive messages, some of a racist nature. His club issued a statement condemning the abuse and confirmed that it had been reported to the social media platforms.

Personal life
Bacuna is the younger brother of Leandro Bacuna, also a footballer.

Career statistics

Club

International

Scores and results list Curaçao's goal tally first; score column indicates score after each Bacuna goal.

References

1997 births
Living people
Footballers from Groningen (city)
Curaçao footballers
Curaçao international footballers
Dutch footballers
Netherlands under-21 international footballers
Netherlands youth international footballers
Association football midfielders
FC Groningen players
Huddersfield Town A.F.C. players
Rangers F.C. players
Birmingham City F.C. players
Eredivisie players
Premier League players
English Football League players
Dutch people of Curaçao descent
Dutch expatriate footballers
Expatriate footballers in England
Expatriate footballers in Scotland
Dutch expatriate sportspeople in England
Dutch expatriate sportspeople in Scotland